Xian Bangdi (born 11 August 1976) is a Chinese sprint canoer who competed in the mid-1990s. She won a silver medal in the K-4 500 m event at the 1995 ICF Canoe Sprint World Championships in Duisburg, Germany.

Xian also finished fourth in the K-4 500 m event at the 1996 Summer Olympics in Atlanta.

References

External links
 
 

1976 births
Living people
Chinese female canoeists
Olympic canoeists of China
Canoeists at the 1996 Summer Olympics
ICF Canoe Sprint World Championships medalists in kayak
Asian Games medalists in canoeing
Asian Games gold medalists for China
Canoeists at the 1994 Asian Games
Medalists at the 1994 Asian Games